Gildeh (also Romanized as Gīldeh; also known as Kīldeh) is a village in Kiashahr Rural District, in the Central District of Astaneh-ye Ashrafiyeh County, Gilan Province, Iran. At the 2006 census, its population was 315, in 82 families.

References 

Populated places in Astaneh-ye Ashrafiyeh County